María Eugenia Larraín Calderón (born October 16, 1973, in Santiago), known as Kenita (or Quenita) Larraín, is a Chilean model and socialite.

Early life and education 
Larraín is the daughter of Patricia Calderón Terán and Mario Larraín Corssen, granddaughter of Mario Larraín del Campo and Javiera Corssen Rivera and great-granddaughter Ricardo Larraín Bravo, descendant of the 1st Marquess of Larraín. Larraín is of Basque descent.

She studied at Liceo Manuel de Salas in Ñuñoa, Santiago. She studied engineering at UNIACC University, a last-tier private college, graduating in 2003.

Career 
In 2008 Larraín participated in the Argentine television show Bailando por un Sueño and in 2009 joined the Chilean reality show Pelotón VIP with her twin brother Mario Larraín. She was first runner-up. In 2011 she starred in the music video of Evailo ("Moya E"), a Bulgarian singer known in Chile for competing in the TV show Yingo. In November 2011 released her first single "Mi Mundo Sin Ti," a cover version of the song by Spanish singer Soraya Arnelas.

In January 2023, it was announced that a theatrical play would be developed about Larraín's life as Kentina. Original music by Camila Moreno, and will be performed at the Gabriela Mistral Cultural Center, with a premiere date for November 2023.

Personal life 
She was married to tennis player Marcelo Ríos. In 2005, she was in a serious car accident due to an oversight by Ríos, which resulted in their separation.

In 2015 she married businessman Sergio Ader, with whom she has a son.

TV appearances

References

External links
 
 Image Gallery, Kenita Larrain (100 pictures)

1973 births
Chilean women engineers
Chilean female models
Chilean television presenters
Chilean people of Basque descent
Chilean people of German descent
Living people
People from Santiago
Association footballers' wives and girlfriends
Participants in Argentine reality television series
Chilean socialites
Chilean twins
21st-century Chilean women singers
Chilean women television presenters
Maria Eugenia
Chilean television personalities
Bailando por un Sueño (Argentine TV series) participants